Car orienteering (Car-O) is a motor racing sport where a map is used to navigate along unfamiliar roads. The sport is most active in Nordic countries. The sport has evolved from rally into a sport with stronger focus on navigation.

International League
The international league is named North European Zone Auto Navigation (NEZ).

See also
Orienteering
Rally raid

References

External links 
 North European Zone Auto Navigation
 Car Orienteering in Finland by AKK Motorsport (Finnish)
 Car Orienteering in Sweden by the Swedish Automobile Sports Federation (Swedish)

Auto racing by type
Orienteering